Haenel is a surname. Notable people with the surname include:

Adèle Haenel (born 1989), French actress
Harold Haenel (born 1958), American sailor
Hubert Haenel (born 1942), French politician
Yannick Haenel (born 1967), French writer

Companies 
C. G. Haenel, German arms company

See also
Hänel